Ashton Skrlik (born May 9, 1999) is a Canadian curler from Calgary, Alberta. She currently plays lead on Team Kayla Skrlik.

Career
Skrlik played third for her sister Kayla Skrlik's rink when the team represented Alberta at the 2016 U18 International Curling Championships. There, the team finished with a 3–2 round robin record, just missing the playoffs. She represented Alberta at her first junior nationals at the 2018 Canadian Junior Curling Championships. At the championship, Skrlik and her team of skip Kayla Skrlik, second Hope Sunley and lead Megan Johnson finished with a 4–2 round robin record, enough to qualify for the championship round. They then went 3–1 against the other pool, however, this was not enough to qualify for the playoffs and they finished in fourth place with a 7–3 record. Also in her junior career, Skrlik played third on the Northern Alberta team that won a gold medal at the 2014 Arctic Winter Games.

Out of juniors, Team Skrlik began competing on the World Curling Tour. For the 2018–19 season, they brought on Brenna Bilassy as their new lead, replacing Johnson. Of their three events played, they reached the quarterfinals of the Avonair Cash Spiel and the Boundary Ford Curling Classic. Skrlik then left her sister's rink for her last year of junior eligibility before rejoining at lead for the 2020–21 season. The team also included third Selena Sturmay and second Brittany Tran. They were unable to play in any events, however, due to the COVID-19 pandemic.

Following the abbreviated season, Sturmay left the team and was replaced by Geri-Lynn Ramsay at third. The team was able to find immediate success by reaching the semifinals of the Alberta Curling Series: Leduc event. They also made the semifinals of the Ladies Alberta Open and were finalists at the Alberta Curling Series: Thistle event to Germany's Daniela Jentsch. In December 2021, they qualified for the 2022 Alberta Scotties Tournament of Hearts by defeating Lindsay Bertsch in the final qualifier. At provincials, the team finished in last place with a 1–6 record. Back on the tour, they reached the final of the Alberta Curling Tour Championship where they lost to Abby Marks. Team Skrlik rounded out their season at the 2022 Best of the West where they failed to reach the playoffs with a 1–2 record.

Personal life
Skrlik's sister Kayla Skrlik is the skip of her team. She is currently a chemistry student at Mount Royal University.

Teams

References

External links

1999 births
Canadian women curlers
Living people
Curlers from Calgary
20th-century Canadian women
21st-century Canadian women
Mount Royal University alumni